Stanislav G. "Stan" Kriventsov (born November 2, 1973, in Moscow, Russia) is a chess International Master and a chess coach who currently resides in Canada after spending ten years in the United States between 1997 and 2007. He was a regular participant of American chess tournaments and has won over 60 United States Chess Federation Grand Prix tournaments, including four Pennsylvania state championships. Kriventsov has played in four US Chess Championships.

Kriventsov has a Ph.D. degree in electrical engineering with a specialization in power electronics from Penn State University, which he obtained in 2004. He worked as an adjunct faculty member at Tulane University in New Orleans, Louisiana, between 2004 and 2007, where he also received an M.S. degree in computer science in 2007.

Kriventsov is also an aspiring poker player. He has played and cashed in several World Series of Poker circuit events.

External links 
 Stan Kriventsov's personal blog
 
 
 
 
 Tournament poker results for Stanislav Kriventsov
 The Hendon Mob - Kriventsov's tournament poker results

1973 births
Living people
Russian chess players
Chess International Masters
Penn State College of Engineering alumni
Tulane University alumni
Chess coaches
Sportspeople from Moscow
Tulane University faculty